Intelsat 6B (IS-6B, PAS-6B) was a satellite providing television and communication services for Intelsat, which it was commissioned by in 2006.

Satellite description 
It was manufactured by Hughes Space and Communications. At beginning of life, it generates 8 kW. This version takes advantage of such advances as dual-junction gallium arsenide solar cells, new battery technology and the first commercial use of a high-efficiency xenon ion propulsion system (XIPS).

Launch 
The satellite was launched on 22 December 1998, 01:08 UTC, on a Ariane 42L H10-3 launch vehicle from the Centre Spatial Guyanais at Kourou in French Guiana. PAS-6B provides satellite services in South America, including direct-to-home (DTH) television services.

Mission 
In 2003, PAS 6B lost the secondary XIPS engines additionally to the earlier loss of the primaries, which will lead to a reduced lifetime.

References

External links 
 Intelsat 6B

Communications satellites in geostationary orbit
Satellites using the BSS-601 bus
Spacecraft launched in 1998
Intelsat satellites